Ankit Sharma may refer to:

 Ankit Sharma (footballer) (born 1991), Indian footballer
 Ankit Sharma (cricketer) (born 1991), Indian cricketer
 Ankit Sharma (athlete) (born 1992), Indian athlete (long jumper)